Rune Jogert (born 15 February 1977) is a Norwegian former professional racing cyclist. He won the Norwegian National Road Race Championship in 2000.

Doping
Jogert tested positive for ephedrine at the Berliner 4-Etappen-Fahrt in 1997 and was subsequently handed a two-month ban by CAS, after the Norwegian Cycling Federation had neglected to inform the UCI about the result.

References

External links

1977 births
Living people
Norwegian male cyclists
Place of birth missing (living people)
Doping cases in cycling
Norwegian sportspeople in doping cases